Daystar Shemuel Shua Peterson (born July 27, 1992), known professionally as Tory Lanez, is a Canadian rapper, singer, songwriter, record producer, and convicted felon. He received initial recognition from the mixtape Conflicts of My Soul: The 416 Story, released in August 2013. In 2015, Tory Lanez signed to record producer Benny Blanco's Mad Love Records through Interscope Records.

Lanez's debut studio album, I Told You (2016), included the singles "Say It" and "Luv", which peaked at number 23 and 19 on the Billboard Hot 100, respectively. In 2018, Lanez released his second and third studio albums, Memories Don't Die and Love Me Now? His fourth studio album Chixtape 5 (2019) peaked at number 2 on the US Billboard 200. In 2020, he released his fifth studio album Daystar, which debuted at number 10 on the Billboard 200 and featured controversial responses to the revelations of him shooting fellow rapper Megan Thee Stallion earlier that year. Lanez received a Grammy Award nomination for his 2016 song "Luv" as well as four Juno Awards over his career.

On December 23, 2022, Lanez was convicted in the Los Angeles County Superior Court of three charges in relation to his attack on Megan Thee Stallion in 2020: assault with a semi-automatic firearm; having a loaded, unregistered firearm in a vehicle; and discharging a firearm with gross negligence. He was afterwards sent to jail, and faces up to 22 years in prison.

Early life
Daystar Shemuel Shua Peterson was born on July 27, 1992 in Brampton, Ontario, to a Bajan father, Sonstar, and a mother from Curaçao, Luella. The family was based in Montreal, before moving to Miami, Florida. Following his mother's death, his father began working as an ordained minister and missionary, causing them both to move frequently throughout the United States. Daystar's father later remarried and the family moved to Atlanta, Georgia, where Daystar met his friend Hakeem, who at the time was a janitor. Daystar's nickname "Lanez" was given to him by Hakeem, as a comment on Daystar's thrill seeking tendencies, that sometimes saw him mucking around in the street, not looking for traffic and playing in the lanes.

In 2006, he was sent to live with his cousin Dahir Abib, Orane Forrest, in Jamaica, Queens, New York because of his behavior issues. Daystar then was forced to move to Toronto with his grandmother. Since she refused to take care of him, he was on his own at the age of 15. "I ended up moving downtown with these three dudes that I didn't really know. I came into the house and I didn't realize how things worked. From like fifteen to eighteen, I was just fighting them. It was every man for himself. That's what made me a man, having to fend for myself and being in a situation where there is no dad, no grandma and no mom to help you. It changed the person that I am today", he says. He then once again started rapping, before giving himself a nickname, Notorious (which is a reference to the late rapper Notorious B.I.G., whom he idolized), and adopted into his new moniker "Tory Lanez". At the age of 16, Daystar dropped out of the tenth grade, and he would begin performing songs at the outdoor concerts. At the age of 17, Daystar began singing, which he found an interest in. However, he had never received any vocal training.

Career

2009–2015: Career beginnings
In 2009, Tory Lanez released his debut mixtape T.L 2 T.O. While Lanez lived in South Florida, he began directing some of his music videos, and posted them on his YouTube channel. Sean Kingston was interested in Lanez after seeing a video of him freestyling over Lloyd Banks' "Beamer, Benz, or Bentley". In February 2010, Kingston contacted Lanez, telling him to meet up with him, during Justin Bieber's tour and later got him to perform on there live. In 2010, Lanez released the mixtapes, Just Landed, One Verse One Hearse, Playing for Keeps and Mr. 1 Verse Killah. In 2011, Lanez signed a record deal with Kingston's Time is Money Entertainment and released the mixtapes, Mr. Peterson, Chixtape, and Swavey. He later left the label to be an independent artist. In 2012, Tory Lanez released the mixtape, Sincerely Tory, Conflicts of My Soul: The 416 Story in 2013, and Chixtape II in 2014. In April 2014, Tory released two episodes of the "Public Swave Announcement", of behind the scenes of the "These Things Happen Tour" with G-Eazy and Rockie Fresh. On June 2, 2014, Lanez released the song, "Teyana", as a tribute to singer Teyana Taylor. Taylor responded with the track, "Dreams of Fuckin' an R&B Bitch". On June 6, 2014, Lanez released, "The Godfather", a song to announce that he was going to start a series called, Fargo Fridays, only releasing songs, albums, or videos on Fridays on HotNewHipHop. The songs, "I'll Be There", "Talk On Road", and "Balenciagas" were released later that month.

After releasing a number of songs from the series, he released a song called "The Mission" to celebrate his tour announcement on August 14, 2014. Lanez kicked off his first headlining tour, the "Lost Cause Tour", in conjunction with the mixtape Lost Cause. The mixtape was supposed to be released on September 29, 2014, but got pushed back to October 1. In an interview, Tory Lanez claimed he has ghost-written songs for artists such as Akon ("Been Gettin' Money" with Jeezy), Casey Veggies ("Actin' Up"), August Alsina ("My Niggas" with Meek Mill), as well as T.I. and Travis Scott. On February 27, 2015, Tory Lanez revealed that he was going to release a collaboration EP with the WeDidIt Records producers on April 6. On April 3, 2015, Tory released the single titled "In For It" for his upcoming EP. On May 8, 2015, Lanez released another song, titled "Ric Flair" featuring Rory Trustory. On May 22, 2015, he released the second single for the EP, titled "Acting Like". On June 19, 2015, Tory announced that the EP would be called, Cruel Intentions and released on June 26, 2015. That same day the single, "Karrueche" was released.

2015–2023: Album releases and growing popularity 

On July 15, 2015, Tory Lanez released the first single off his debut album, titled "Say It". It was also revealed that he signed to Benny Blanco's Mad Love Records and Interscope Records. On September 18, 2015, Lanez released the single, "BLOW". December 25, 2015, Lanez released the two mixtapes, Chixtape III and The New Toronto. On January 18, 2016, "LA Confidential" was released as the second single for the album. On January 28, 2016, Tory Lanez made a guest appearance on Jimmy Kimmel Live! performing "Say It". He performed the song with the popular 90s R&B group Brownstone (group) of whom he sampled their hit "If You Love Me (Brownstone song)" on 'Say It'. A month later, Lanez released a remix of MadeinTYO's "Uber Everywhere". On March 4, 2016, Lanez released the song, "Tim Duncan" as a part of his Fargo Fridays series. He released the song, "Real Addresses" the next week.

On April 1, 2016, ASAP Ferg and Tory Lanez announced "The Level Up Tour". On April 5, 2016, it was revealed that Tory Lanez would perform at Summer Jam and Pemberton Music Festival in the summer of 2016. On April 8, 2016, Tory Lanez and ASAP Ferg collaborated on the song, "Line Up the Flex" to promote their "Level Up" tour. On April 18, Tory Lanez refused to be on the 2016 XXL Freshmen cover because he felt he was in a higher league musically than the other artists being considered. On May 6, 2016, Lanez released two songs, "For Real" and "Unforgetful" as a part of the Fargo Friday series. On July 29, 2016, Lanez released the official second single "Luv" on iTunes. He also revealed that his album title would be I Told You. I Told You was released on August 19, 2016. On July 5, Lanez released two remixes for Drake's "Controlla" and DJ Khaled's "I Got the Keys". On July 20, Lanez announced the I Told You tour to promote the album.
On March 2, 2018, Lanez released his second studio album Memories Don't Die. Within the same year, he has also released an album titled Love Me Now? on October 26, 2018, He also released an album titled Chixtape 5 on November 15, 2019, and another album titled The New Toronto 3 on April 10, 2020, the latter marking his final release with Interscope Records.

On March 20, 2020, Lanez teamed up with Jamaican reggae singer Buju Banton for a remix of "Trust".

During the quarantine lockdown due to the COVID-19 pandemic, Lanez hosted "Quarantine Radio" on his Instagram Live. On May 14, 2020, Lanez released the  single "Temperature Rising", via his own One Umbrella imprint, marking his first release as an independent artist, following his departure from Interscope Records. On July 10, Lanez released three singles, "Simple Things, with DJDS and Rema, "Staccato", and "392", with his label signee VV$ Ken. The latter two tracks was released as an EP called VVS Capsule.

On September 25, 2020, Lanez surprise-released his fifth album, Daystar, his first project since departing Interscope earlier the year. On the album, he defends himself in multiple songs against claims that he shot rapper Megan Thee Stallion.

Following the releases of the synth pop album Alone at Prom and Sorry 4 What, Lanez was convicted of three felonies in relation to his shooting of Megan Thee Stallion marking his final releases. While incarcerated, Lanez's track The Color Violet experienced a boost in popularity thanks to popular social media app TikTok, entering multiple international charts.

One Umbrella

One Umbrella is a Canadian record label and management company founded by Tory Lanez in 2014. It began as a clothing company under the subsidiary Forever Umbrella. The label's first signee was Mansa in 2018, and expanded to sign artists Mariah the Scientist, and Kaash Paige. In 2020, Lanez released his first single as an independent artist, writing "I waited and calculated for 4 years to be my own boss. I own all my own masters, publishing, royalties etc. This may not mean nothing to y'all but seeing my record label at the bottom unattached to a major label is what we have worked this hard for".

Roster

Former
 Mariah the Scientist (formerly with RCA)
 Kaash Paige (formerly with Se Lavi and Def Jam)

Musical style 
In an interview on Nice Kicks with Ian Stonebook, Lanez described his own personal style he calls, Swavey: "Swavey is a two-adjective word. A lot of people use it as an attribute, but the real definition of swavey is a genre of music. The genre of music is the genre of fusing more than one together. I know it sounds strange, but if you ask an artist what they do they're going to say that they rap, they sing, they do rock, a lot of people are multi-talented. They get looked at confused, but I don't think that they're confused. I feel that they're just talented, swavey artists. Labels want to put you in one lane, but I feel like there are so many people are more than that and they're swavey artists."

Among his musical inspirations growing up Lanez cites Brandy and Ray J.

Controversies

Drake
In 2010, Lanez posted a video on YouTube, challenging fellow Canadian rapper Drake, to whom he was rumored to be related. The video features him denying these rumors and announcing the $10,000 challenge. While showing Drake respect, Lanez again challenged him, but only if Drake would listen to some of his tracks from his second mixtape Playing for Keeps. Lanez also claimed that if Drake did not like it, he would personally give to him $10,000. In August 2015, while appearing on the "Sway in the Morning" radio show on Shade 45, Lanez had taken a shot at Drake, alluding to the infamous freestyle he had performed on Hot 97 six years prior where he had read lyrics from his BlackBerry. In October 2015, Lanez created additional tension with the rapper when he expressed his dislike of the use of "the 6", a nickname for Toronto that had been popularized by Drake.

In the lyrics of his 2016 single "Summer Sixteen", Drake appears to make a subliminal diss at Lanez, rapping: "All you boys in the new Toronto want to be me a little." Many took this, and the ensuing lines, to be something off a shot taken towards Lanez. Drake also took aim at Meek Mill who, in the midst of their ongoing feud, criticised Drake for dissing Lanez on the song, "War Pain": "Tory from the 6, you hatin' on him, Lord knows!" In an interview with Revolt, Lanez was asked about the perceived shot. He was skeptical about whether it was aimed at him at all, he assured the press that he would not be responding even if it was: "Drake could diss me 20,000 times, and I'd never diss him. I'm a fan... I have no negativity on my side. All blessings to that man." When Lanez released his version of, "Uber Everywhere", he raps, "Pussy boy, smack that smile clean off your face / You don't know no trap niggas, you don't be around this way / You some actor nigga boy, I used to see you on the screen". Many people thought Lanez was taking shots at Drake. Lanez dissed Drake again in the song, "Line Up the Flex" with ASAP Ferg. Lanez rapped "I was never gang, gang, gang, gang/ I was One Umbrella Mob", in a response to Drake's shot at him on "Summer Sixteen".

Drake fired back in the song "Still Here" on the album Views. In an interview with Zane Lowe on Beats 1, Drake spoke on Lanez: "I encourage anybody to go out there and do the most damage that you possibly can. Do you things. Get all the fruits. Get everything. Become the biggest artist you can possibly be. Just don't get up there finally and start talking down on me, especially when we have no interaction." Lanez took shots at Drake again in the song, "For Real". On June 27, 2016, Lanez talked to Ebro on the Ebro in the Morning show and he stated about Drake, and said "Hip-hop is a contact sport, I'm here to compete, I'm here to be #1." He went on to say, "I was a fan of his music before, no one's ever took that from me. That doesn't mean I'm not here to take my crown."

Jacquees
In February 2016, Jacquees tweeted, "Chris [Brown] my idol/big bro he don't count never will but you other guys im at yo throat #FuckHowYouFeel". The tweet meant that Jacquees is in a fierce competition with every R&B artist in the game, except for Chris Brown, who he says is his idol. The tweet was not convincing to Lanez, who responded to Jacquees with two choice emojis. Jacquees took Lanez's emoji response as an assault, and he went on to call Lanez a "peasant" and "watermelon head ass". Jacquees did, however, take the time to compliment Lanez's penmanship, though he implied that Lanez's vocal talents are not up to par with his own. Lanez did not respond to Jacquees, but told his fans to "advise that boy".

The two later ended their rivalry at South by Southwest. They later announced in August 2016 that they were going on tour together.

2016 concert
On March 26, 2016, during a concert in Midland, Texas, violent scuffles between security forces and concertgoers occurred. Lanez then proceeded to tell the crowd to "fuck shit up," which incited a riot and forced police to shut down the show. Multiple people were arrested. The venue and concert promoters considered legal actions against Lanez.

Joyner Lucas 
In November 2018, during an Instagram Live session, Lanez claimed that he's a better rapper than American rapper Joyner Lucas. In response, Lucas challenged Lanez to a rap battle, which led to several diss records being released between the two, including the "Lucky You Freestyle" and the "Zeze Freestyle". Although the beef was short-lived, Lanez expressed distaste at those who sided with Lucas. The end of the beef was once more evident when the two released a remix of DaBaby's song "Suge".

Don Q 
Shortly after his beef with Joyner Lucas ensued, New York rapper Don Q dropped a battle track titled "I'm Not Joyner", alleging that Lanez was stealing Q's lyrics. Lanez fired back with a track called "Dom Queen", before Q responded with another diss track. Another rapper, Dreamville artist JID was involved in the beef, seemingly displeased with previous statements Lanez took aim at his mentor, J. Cole. Lanez then challenged the entire Dreamville artist roster in response, with rappers including DreamDoll responding with their own tracks aimed at Lanez.

Response 
In response to Lanez's various rap beefs, Karlton Jahmal of hip hop publication HotNewHipHop said "the art of the competitive, lyrical battle rap has been missing from the mainstream wave for years...", until Lanez brought the culture exactly what it has been missing with his friendly yet competitive take. Jahmal concluded that Lanez was essentially "engineering an overall shift back to the roots of hip-hop [...] more about proving lyrical talent than they are about utterly destroying an opponent".

Shooting of Megan Thee Stallion

On July 12, 2020, after leaving a house party where there had been an argument that resulted in violence, Lanez was arrested in the Hollywood Hills and charged with carrying a concealed weapon in his vehicle. Another rap artist, Megan Thee Stallion, was also in the car, and was initially reported to have had a foot wound caused by glass. However, in an Instagram post, Megan later disputed this, stating she underwent surgery after suffering "gunshot wounds, as a result of a crime that was committed against me and done with the intention to physically harm me". At the time, she did not state who shot her. On Instagram Live in August 2020, Megan stated that she was shot by Lanez during this incident. She also voiced her opinions against his publicist team, saying: "You shot me, and you got your publicist and your people going to these blogs lyin' and shit. Stop lyin'. Why lie?"

On September 25, 2020, Lanez released his fifth album, Daystar, in which he addresses the shooting on nearly every song, and denies that he shot Megan, while also claiming she and her team were "trying to frame" him; on the song "Money Over Fallouts", he raps: "how you get shot in your foot, don't hit no bones or tendons". The same day, in a statement to Variety, Megan's attorney, Alex Spiro, claimed Lanez's representatives had since attempted to launch a "smear campaign" against Megan to discredit her allegations. Spiro stated: "We have been made aware of manipulated text messages and invented email accounts that have been disseminated to the media in a calculated attempt to peddle a false narrative about the events that occurred". Lanez's team denied this, saying that they would investigate who was behind the fake emails and will take appropriate action.

On September 29, 2020, following negative responses to Lanez from certain publications, the rapper claimed on Instagram that news sites had launched a smear campaign against him, stating that he has "never seen verified publications ... come together with 'biased' opinions for a smear campaign on an artist", and questioning who is "paying" them. In October 2020, Lanez was officially charged with felony counts of assault with a semiautomatic firearm, personal use of a firearm, and carrying a loaded, unregistered firearm in a vehicle. He also faced an allegation that he personally inflicted great bodily injury with a gun. He was to be arraigned on October 13, however, it was delayed to November 18, after Lanez's attorney requested a continuance. A protective order has since been issued against Lanez; he is to stay at least 100 yards away from Megan and not contact her. He was also ordered to surrender any guns he owns. In an op-ed for The New York Times, published on October 13, 2020, Megan addressed the shooting further, writing: "Black women are still constantly disrespected and disregarded in so many areas of life. I was recently the victim of an act of violence by a man. After a party, I was shot twice as I walked away from him. We were not in a relationship. Truthfully, I was shocked that I ended up in that place".

According to MRC Data, after Megan stated Lanez shot her, his streaming figures decreased significantly from around 30 million in June 2020 to roughly 9 million. Kehlani subsequently announced that she would remove Lanez's verse on her song "Can I"; Lanez did not appear in the song's music video.

In April 2022, Lanez was arrested for violating a protection order relating to the case; he was released shortly after on an increased bond of $350,000.

On December 23, 2022, Lanez was convicted in a jury trial on three felony charges in respect to the shooting: assault with a semiautomatic handgun, having a loaded and unregistered firearm in a vehicle, and gross negligence in discharging his firearm. Lanez, who was tried in Los Angeles, was taken to jail immediately following the conviction.

Personal life
Lanez has a son named Kai.

Lanez also goes by the name Argentina Fargo. In an interview, he said "When I put foreign and banking together, it's like foreign money. I’m a Canadian dude, walking around America. When you look at me, it's like looking at foreign money. So I call myself Argentina Fargo—like foreign money."

Discography

 I Told You (2016)
 Memories Don't Die (2018)
 Love Me Now? (2018)
 Chixtape 5 (2019)
 Daystar (2020)
 Alone at Prom (2021)
 Sorry 4 What (2022)

Awards and nominations

References

External links

1992 births
Living people
21st-century Black Canadian male singers
Canadian hip hop singers
Canadian people convicted of assault
Canadian people of Barbadian descent
Canadian people of Curaçaoan descent
Canadian male rappers
21st-century Canadian rappers
21st-century Canadian criminals
Canadian male criminals
Interscope Records artists
Juno Award for Rap Recording of the Year winners
Musicians from Brampton
Juno Award for R&B/Soul Recording of the Year winners
People convicted of illegal possession of weapons
Rappers from Toronto
Pop rappers
Canadian contemporary R&B singers
Prisoners and detainees of the United States
Canadian prisoners and detainees